The Airborne Launch Control System (ALCS) provides a survivable launch capability for the United States Air Force's LGM-30G Minuteman III intercontinental ballistic missile (ICBM) force. The ALCS is operated by airborne missileers from Air Force Global Strike Command's (AFGSC) 625th Strategic Operations Squadron (STOS) and United States Strategic Command (USSTRATCOM). The system is located on board the United States Navy's E-6B Mercury, which serves as USSTRATCOM's "Looking Glass" Airborne Command Post (ABNCP). The ALCS crew is integrated into the ABNCP battle staff and is on alert around the clock.

Overview
In the mid-1960s, United States civilian and military leadership became concerned about the possibility of a decapitating attack from the Soviets, destroying any land-based communication links to the nuclear forces of the Strategic Air Command. One solution to the communication problem was placing radio equipment on board an aircraft, and allow it to fly over the United States and use radio broadcasts to pass along information. This concept would allow communication to missile launch crews to pass along Emergency Action Messages (EAMs), but would not duplicate the missile combat crew's function of actually launching the missiles. The key characteristic added to ALCS (versus other communication methods such as ERCS) was giving the airborne crews the same degree of access to the launch facilities as the underground missile crews.

Minuteman launch facilities contained an ultra high frequency (UHF) receiver that would pick up commands from the ALCS; the destruction of the launch control center or the hardened intersite cable system would not prevent retaliation.

History
ALCS' first generation equipment was declared operational on 31 May 1967.

Operational information

ALCS-configured aircraft
The ALCS mission has been held by multiple aircraft during the last 50 years:
EC-135 – performed Looking Glass and ALCC mission for the Strategic Air Command (1967–1998)
EC-135A (ALCC)
EC-135C (ABNCP and ALCC)
EC-135G (ALCC and ABNCP)
EC-135L PACCS Radio Relay
E-4B Advanced Airborne Command Post – Aircraft tail number 75-0125 performed Looking Glass on a trial basis from 1980 to 1981 to assess possibility of replacing EC-135 fleet. Deemed too expensive and ALCS was subsequently removed from the E-4B.
E-6B Mercury – performs Looking Glass, ALCC, and TACAMO mission for United States Strategic Command (1998–Present)
E-6B

ICBMs remotely controlled
LGM-30A/B Minuteman I (1967–1975)
LGM-30F Minuteman II (1967–1992)
LGM-30G Minuteman III (1971–present)
LGM-118A Peacekeeper (1987–2005)

Units

Units with ALCS crewmembers assigned
68th Strategic Missile Squadron (Ellsworth AFB, SD: 1967-1970)
91st Strategic Missile Wing (Minot AFB, ND: 1967-1969)
4th Airborne Command and Control Squadron (Ellsworth AFB, SD: 1970-1992)
2nd Airborne Command and Control Squadron (Offutt AFB, NE: 1970-1994)
7th Airborne Command and Control Squadron (Offutt AFB, NE: 1994-1998)
625th Missile Operations Flight/USSTRATCOM (Offutt AFB, NE: 1998-2007)
625th Strategic Operations Squadron/USSTRATCOM (Offutt AFB, NE: 2007–Present)

Units with ALCS-equipped aircraft
28th Air Refueling Squadron (Ellsworth AFB, SD: 1967-1970)
EC-135A, EC-135G
906th Air Refueling Squadron (Minot AFB, ND: 1967-1969
EC-135A, EC-135L
38th Strategic Reconnaissance Squadron (Offutt AFB, NE: 1967-1970)
EC-135C
4th Airborne Command and Control Squadron (Ellsworth AFB, SD: 1970-1992)
EC-135A, EC-135C, EC-135G, EC-135L
2nd Airborne Command and Control Squadron (Offutt AFB, NE: 1970-1994)
EC-135C
7th Airborne Command and Control Squadron (Offutt AFB, NE: 1994-1998)
EC-135C
STRATCOMWING ONE (Tinker AFB, OK: 1998–Present)
Fleet Air Reconnaissance Squadron 3 (VQ-3)
E-6B Mercury
Fleet Air Reconnaissance Squadron 4 (VQ-4)
E-6B Mercury

ALCS personnel
The Airborne Launch Control System Flight of the 625th Strategic Operations Squadron provides training and crewmembers for two ALCS positions on board the E-6B Mercury.

ALCS-assisted launches
A test of the ALCS, both ground and air components, is called a GIANT BALL.

This list does not contain any launches after the initial Test and Evaluation phase of the system.

See also

References

External links
 
 E-6B ABNCP Factsheet
 LGM-30G Minuteman III Factsheet

Missile launchers
Military radio systems of the United States
Nuclear warfare
Military communications
United States nuclear command and control